Giangurra is a coastal town in the Cairns Region, Queensland, Australia. It is within the locality of East Trinity on the eastern coast of Trinity Bay.

Geography 
Giangurra is on the northern coast of East Trinity near Bessie Point

History 
The name Giangurra means village of wild rose thorn, but the language or dialect is unknown.

The town was named on 1 December 1962  by the Queensland Place Names Board.

Education 
There are no schools in Giangurra. The nearest government primary school is  Yarrabah State School in Yarrabah to the east. The nearest government secondary schools are Yarrabah State School (to Year 10) and Gordonvale State High School (to Year 12) in Gordonvale to the south.

References

External links 
 

Cairns Region
Towns in Queensland